In August 2022, Shahram Poursafi (also known as "Mehdi Rezayi"), a member of Iran's Islamic Revolutionary Guard Corps, was charged for "providing and attempting to provide material support to a transnational murder plot".

The Department of Justice charged Poursafi with "plotting to assassinate former President Donald Trump's national security advisor John Bolton."

Poursafi is currently wanted by the FBI. If captured and convicted, he could face up to 15 years in jail for "providing and attempting to provide material support to a transnational murder plot".

Background

U.S. prosecutors said that Poursafi's attempt to arrange the killing of Bolton was "likely" in retaliation for the Assassination of Qasem Soleimani in 2020. Bolton has also been an open critic of Iran's atomic program.

Charges

The charges describe Poursafi contacting a US resident that he had met on the Internet and asking for photographs of John Bolton for an alleged book he was working on. The unnamed resident then referred Poursafi to another person who was then asked to "kill Mr Bolton and provide video evidence of the murder."

The person who was offered the money then became an informant for the FBI. He continued to communicate with Poursafi using an encrypted communications app.

Poursafi provided the FBI informant with Bolton's office address, saying he wanted "the guy" to be "purged or eliminated".

According to court papers, Poursafi negotiated a potential payment of $300,000 for the hiring of the assassination. According to the Justice Department, Poursafi also mentioned an "additional job" for which $1 million would be paid.

Reactions

John Bolton said that the Biden administration was holding back "criticism of Iran’s government for the targeting of both himself and other Americans on US soil for fear of tanking nuclear negotiations with Tehran." Bolton also said "I think this is a plot by the Iranian government against a former official of the US government. I can say I'm not the only one that the Ayatollahs in Tehran are trying to assassinate."

The Justice Department's Assistant Attorney General Matthew G. Olsen said "This is not the first time we have uncovered Iranian plots to exact revenge against individuals on U.S. soil and we will work tirelessly to expose and disrupt every one of these efforts."

The White House warned the Iranian government of "severe consequences" if it targets U.S. citizens.

See also
Iranian diplomat terror plot trial
Trial of Hamid Nouri
2011 alleged Iran assassination plot
Iranian assassination plot of ASMLA leadership in Denmark
Iran and state-sponsored terrorism
Kazem Rajavi
Stabbing of Salman Rushdie
Human rights in the Islamic Republic of Iran

References

Murder in the United States
Assassinations
Islamic Revolutionary Guard Corps
History of Iran
History of the United States